Willoughby's Beach is the second EP by Australian psychedelic rock band King Gizzard & the Lizard Wizard. It was released on 21 October 2011. It peaked at No. 15 on the ARIA Albums Chart after being released on vinyl in November 2018.

The EP generally features a rawer and less refined sound compared to its successor 12 Bar Bruise. The album features the band's first use of unconventional and experimental instruments such as the theremin.

Track listing 
Vinyl releases have tracks 1-5 on Side A and tracks 6-9 on Side B.

Personnel 
Credits for Willoughby's Beach EP adapted from liner notes.

King Gizzard & the Lizard Wizard
Michael Cavanagh – drums
Lucas Skinner – bass, vocals
Joey Walker – guitar, vocals
Stu Mackenzie – vocals, guitar
Ambrose Kenny-Smith – harmonica
Cook Craig – guitar, vocals
Eric Moore – drums, theremin

Production
Paul Maybury – recording, mixing
Joseph Carra – mastering
Ican Harem – cover art
Ben Butcher – insert photo

Charts

References

2011 EPs
King Gizzard & the Lizard Wizard EPs
Self-released EPs